Patrick Barton is an Australian TV director best known for his productions in the 1960s.

Select Credits
You Can't Win 'Em All (1962)
The Gioconda Smile (1963)
Night Stop (1963)
Double Yolk (1963)
The Angry General (1964)
The Sponge Room (1964)
The Road (1964)
Wind from the Icy Country (1964)
A Provincial Lady (1964)
Dangerous Corner (1965)
A Time to Speak (1965)
Cross of Gold (1965)
Othello (1964)
Daphne Laureola (1965)
Romanoff and Juliet (1965)
Ashes to Ashes (1966)
Waiting in the Wings (1965)
Should the Woman Pay? (1966)
Love and War (1967)
Quality of Mercy (1975)
Bellbird (TV series)

References

External links

Patrick Barton at National Film and Sound Archive

Australian directors
Possibly living people
Year of birth missing